The Pkhista is a river in the  West Caucasus, near the border between Georgia (Abkhazia) and Russia. It is one of two main left hand side tributaries of the Psou River, the other being the Besh River. Both tributaries are in Georgia.

References

Rivers of Abkhazia
Rivers of Georgia (country)
Tributaries of the Black Sea